The Tennant Creek Telegraph Station is an historical site about 16 kilometres north of Tennant Creek in the Northern Territory of Australia.

History
The Warumungu Aboriginal people were the first occupants of the region in and around Tennant Creek. The telegraph station is near a very significant sacred site called "Jurnkurakurr", which is home to a Dreamtime being called "Jalawala", a black-nosed python.

The Tennant Creek Telegraph Station was built in 1872. It was first a temporary bush timber building but by 1875 had been rebuilt with locally quarried stone. It operated as a repeater station as part of the Overland Telegraph Line which connected Darwin to Adelaide. It also operated as a government rations depot. By the 1920s it featured a blacksmith shop, cart shed, ration store, meat house, smokehouse and cellar. Warumungu people were employed at the station as cattlemen and slaughter-men. But the 1890s more than 100 Aboriginal people were living at the station. It was declared an Aboriginal Reserve.

The search for gold began from the 1880s. In 1925, a linesman discovered gold, with the discovery quickly leading to the establishment of a township to the south of the telegraph station. In 1935 a post and wireless office became operational in the town of Tennant Creek itself, so that the telegraph station was closed. It then reverted to a rations depot, supplying meat to the new town and water from its bore until 1966.

Postmasters

Recent history
The station was listed on the now-defunct Register of the National Estate on 25 March 1986.  The station was listed on the Northern Territory Heritage Register on 4 July 2001. The land including the Telegraph Station and its immediate surroundings was originally proposed in 1987 as a historical reserve known as the Tennant Creek Telegraph Station Historical Reserve but progress  was delayed by a claim on the land made under Aboriginal Land Rights Act (Northern Territory) in 1980 .  The claim was resolved in August 2001 with the historical reserve awaiting official naming in April 2002.  Significant restoration work was undertaken on the remaining station buildings in 2012.

References 

Buildings and structures in Tennant Creek
Northern Territory Heritage Register
Telegraph stations in Australia
Northern Territory places listed on the defunct Register of the National Estate
1872 establishments